Kubra Yahya kyzy Farajeva (1907-1988) was a Soviet-Azerbaijani Politician (Communist).

She served as Minister of Health in 1947–1950.

References

1907 births
1988 deaths
20th-century Azerbaijani women politicians
20th-century Azerbaijani politicians
Soviet women in politics
Azerbaijani communists
Women government ministers of Azerbaijan